Garage Sale may refer to:
 A garage sale
 Garage Sale (That '70s Show), an episode of That '70s Show
 Garage Sale, a half-episode of Rugrats (see List of Rugrats episodes)
 Kesey's Garage Sale
 , the Japanese comedy duo.
 Garage Sale (The Office), episode of The Office.
 "Yard Sale" (Cow and Chicken), an episode of Cow and Chicken